Wesley Harrison Allen (born August 15, 1975) is an American politician and former probate judge who is the incumbent Secretary of State of Alabama, serving since 2023. He was previously a member of the Alabama House of Representatives, representing the 89th district from 2018 to 2022, and was elected as Secretary of State in 2022.

Education
Allen earned a bachelor's degree from the University of Alabama and a master's degree from Troy University. As an undergraduate, Allen played on the Alabama Crimson Tide football team under coaches Dabo Swinney and Gene Stallings.

Early political activities
In 2009, Allen was appointed to serve as a probate judge of Pike County, Alabama by then-Governor Bob Riley. Allen won election to a full term as a judge in 2012. In 2018, Allen was elected to the Alabama House of Representatives, succeeding Alan Boothe.

Alabama Secretary of State
On May 5, 2021, Allen announced his candidacy for secretary of state of Alabama in the 2022 election. Allen came in second out of a field of four candidates in the Republican primary on May 24, 2022, forcing a runoff election with State Auditor Jim Zeigler. The runoff election was held on June 21, 2022, and Allen defeated Zeigler with the largest percentage margin of victory of any Republican primary race held in Alabama on that date, earning 64% of the votes cast. Allen went on to win the general election against Democratic nominee Pamela Lafitte and Libertarian nominee Jason "Matt" Shelby, with Allen attaining 65% of the vote.

Political positions

Election security
As a member of the Alabama House of Representatives, Allen served as the vice-chair of the Constitution, Campaigns and Elections Committee. As a member and leader of that committee, Allen played a key role in determining which bills would make it to the floor of the House to be debated by the full body and which bills would be voted down during the committee process. Allen used his experience and knowledge as a former Probate Judge, the chief elections official at the county level, to advance several key election security bills. During the 2021 legislative session, Allen sponsored and passed a bill to ban curbside voting in Alabama. That bill was signed into law by Governor Kay Ivey on May 26, 2021. In 2022, Allen sponsored and passed HD89, commonly referred to in the media as the "Zuckerbucks" bill. The legislation, signed into law by Governor Ivey, prohibits state and local election officials from accepting private donations to fund election-related expenses. The bill was passed in response to reports in the 2020 election that Mark Zuckerberg, founder of Facebook, reportedly directed some $350 million in donations, or "Zuckerbucks," to more than 2,500 election officials throughout the country. Allen has also made several campaign promises during his run for secretary of state that relate to election security. He has promised that no election machine in Alabama will be connected to the internet under his watch. He has also strongly opposes ballot drop boxes and mass mail voting.

ERIC 
Allen vowed that, if elected, his first act as secretary of state would be to withdraw Alabama from membership in the Electronic Registration Information Center, also known as ERIC. Allen asserted that the $25,000 membership fee was a waste of taxpayer dollars and contended that Alabamians would not agree to their information being used by ERIC to maintain accurate voter rolls. Allen also had concerns over the fact that the seed money used to start ERIC was connected to organizations funded by George Soros.

A week after his victory in the 2022 Alabama Secretary of State general election, Allen sent a letter to the Electronic Registration Information Center informing the organization that Alabama would withdraw from participating in the program immediately upon his inauguration on January 16, 2023. Alabama's withdrawal from ERIC became official on that day, following Allen's inauguration as Allen signed a letter to ERIC notifying them of his withdrawal minutes after being sworn in.

Second Amendment
Wes Allen is a vocal supporter of the 2nd amendment. Allen voted for and co-sponsored Alabama's constitutional carry legislation which was signed into law in 2022.

Transgender policies
Allen sponsored the Alabama Vulnerable Child Protection Act, which prohibits doctors from administering puberty blockers to children in Alabama for the purpose of changing their sex. It also bans sex change surgeries from being performed on minors in the state. The bill was passed and signed into law by Alabama's governor in 2022.

Abortion
Allen believes that life begins at conception and has been vocal about his anti-abortion stance. He voted for and co-sponsored one of the toughest anti-abortion laws in the country, the Human Life Protection Act, which was signed into law in 2019. The law was initially held up by an injunction in federal court but that injunction was lifted after the United States Supreme Court overturned Roe v. Wade and the Human Life Protection Act became law.

Personal life
Allen's father, Gerald Allen, has served as a member of the Alabama Legislature since 1994. Allen and his wife, Cae, have two children and live in Troy, Alabama.

References

|-

1975 births
Living people
People from Pike County, Alabama
People from Troy, Alabama
Republican Party members of the Alabama House of Representatives
Secretaries of State of Alabama
Troy University alumni
University of Alabama alumni